Christopher Bennett (born 1996) is an Irish hurler who plays for Dublin Senior Championship club Faughs. He is a former member of the Dublin senior hurling team, with whom he usually lined out as a forward.

Career

A member of the Faughs club in Templeogue, Bennett first came to prominence on the inter-county scene during a three-year tenure with the Dublin minor team. An All-Ireland runner-up in this grade, he later won a Leinster Under-21 Championship medal with the Dublin under-21 team. Bennett was straight out of the minor grade when he was drafted onto the Dublin senior hurling team in 2015. His three-year senior career saw him win a Walsh Cup title.

Honours

Dublin
Walsh Cup: 2016
Leinster Under-21 Hurling Championship: 2016
Leinster Minor Hurling Championship: 2012

References

1996 births
Living people
Faughs hurlers
Dublin inter-county hurlers